The Great Seal of Quebec is a governmental seal used to authenticate documents issued by the Government of Quebec that are released in the name of the King in Right of Quebec, including the appointment of the Executive Council and Ministers (the Cabinet), as well as justices of the peace and judges of provincial courts.

Design
The seal is blue with a large fleur-de-lis in the centre, surrounded by a ring of smaller fleurs-de-lis. The words  are displayed around the central fleur-de-lis.

In 1979, this seal replaced an earlier version, which displayed the shield from the royal coat of arms of the United Kingdom along with a Tudor Crown above and the coat of arms of Quebec below.

See also
Symbols of Quebec
Great Seal of Ontario
Great Seal of Canada

References

External links
Image of the old Great Seal of Quebec

Quebec, Great Seal of
Provincial symbols of Quebec
Monarchy in Canada